Grace Cook may refer to:

 Songwriter mother of musician Eddie Hazel
 A. Grace Cook, astronomer

See also
 Grace Cooke House in Honolulu